Chipokota Mayamba Cindy Mwanawasa (born 25 November 1988), is a Zambian lawyer, farmer and entrepreneur. Mwanawasa holds a Masters in Commercial Law from the University of Cape Town, and a joint Honours degree in English and French Law from the University of Kent and Université de Bordeaux IV.

Early life and education 

Chipokota Mwanawasa is the daughter of Levy Mwanawasa the 3rd republic president of Zambia and lawyer and politician Maureen Mwanawasa

Mwanawasa spent the early part of her childhood in Ndola town on the Copperbelt in Zambia before moving to Lusaka where she attended Nkwazi Primary School - at the time it was a Zambia Consolidated Copper Mines Trust School - between 1994 and 2001. She then proceeded to Chengelo Secondary School in Mkushi where she studied for her secondary education from 2002 to 2006. During the gap year between 2007 and 2009, Mwanawasa attended Concord College to do her A-levels and, in the process, became the first African Head Girl at this school.

For her tertiary education, Mwanawasa attended the University of Kent, in the United Kingdom, between September 2009 and June 2013 where she studied for her LLB in English and French Law Degree. She then pursued an LLM Masters in Commercial Law Degree from 2014 to 2016 at the University of Cape Town where she graduated with a distinction. Having been awarded a Chevening Scholarship, Mwanawasa then went to study for an MSc Masters in Public Policy Degre from the London School of Economics and Political Science from 2019 to 2020.

in 2012, Mwanawasa did an Erasmus year studying for her certificate in French law at the University of Bordeaux Faculty of Law and Political Science. As a result, she learnt how to work in the French language.

From September 2020 to April 2021, she attended an Advanced Course in Natural Resource Governance and Development: Policies and Practice at ETH in Zurich.

Career 
Mwanawasa is a law lecturer at University of Zambia. Prior to that, she worked as an Executive Assistant and then Legal Officer at Konkola Copper Mines. She has also worked as a researcher in the United Kingdom, Kenya and South Africa.

Just before the 2016 Zambian presidential, parliamentary, and local government elections, Mwanawasa, alongside directing her commercial farming and agribusiness ventures, dedicated a full year to work as a political strategist for the United Party for National Development candidate Hakainde Hichilema who later became the 7th Zambian republican president.

Farming and business career 
Mwanawasa has been involved in a number of businesses including Chibombo District based Cattle Wealth Management Firm. The ranching company sells cattle to clients and then rears them on behalf of clients.

Awards and recognition 
In 2019, she was awarded a Chevening Scholarship to study for an MSc Masters in Public Policy Degre from the London School of Economics and Political Science.

Publications 
Mwanawasa co-authored the discussion paper Elections in Africa: Preparing a democratic playbook.

Personal life 
Mwanawasa has been involved in charity work and advocacy for the under-privileged.

References

Zambian women lawyers
Zambian farmers
Zambian women farmers
Living people
People from Lusaka
People from Ndola
1988 births
21st-century Zambian lawyers